"You Give Love a Bad Name" is a song by American rock band Bon Jovi, released as the first single from their 1986 album Slippery When Wet. Written by Jon Bon Jovi, Richie Sambora, and Desmond Child about a woman who has jilted her lover, the song reached No. 1 on the U.S. Billboard Hot 100 on November 29, 1986, and became the band's first number one hit. In 2007, the song reentered the charts at No. 29 after Blake Lewis performed it on American Idol.

Despite the lyrics of the chorus, the song should not be confused with "Shot Through the Heart", an unrelated song from Bon Jovi's 1984 self-titled debut album.

Composition
The melody of "You Give Love a Bad Name" was originally written for Bonnie Tyler under the title "If You Were a Woman (And I Was a Man)" with different lyrics commissioned by its producer Jim Steinman. Dissatisfied with its success in the US and the UK (which he attributed to reticence on the part of her label in promoting it), Desmond Child re-wrote the song with Jon Bon Jovi and Richie Sambora.

The song is written in the key of C minor and has a tempo of 123 BPM.

The album version of the song ends with the title being repeated until it fades.

Upon the release of the Ava Max song "Kings & Queens", comparisons were drawn with that song, "You Give Love a Bad Name" and "If You Were a Woman (And I Was a Man)", and reviews highlighted Desmond Child's credit as a songwriter for "Kings & Queens".

Reception
Cash Box called it a "jackhammer single" that could push Bon Jovi to massive success and said that "Jon Bon Jovi’s grinding vocal and the anthemic production spell A-O-R."  Billboard called it "hard rock, raspy and aggressive."

In a retrospective analysis, Chris Molanphy expressed his disgust at the song for being spiteful and derisive in its lyrics, and calling them "sub-Meat Loaf" (Meat Loaf being best known for his work with Steinman). However, he did credit it for introducing the genre of hair metal to the mainstream. He also noted in another commentary how the song shared many similarities with Steinman's songs due to Child's involvement, saying "Steinman might as well have [produced it]", due to Child using devices such as its verbose title and anthemic chorus, likening it to Bat Out of Hell' infused with Aqua Net".

Music video
The music video for the song used all-color concert footage (the only all-color video song from Slippery When Wet) and photogenic shots primarily of Jon Bon Jovi, as well as other band members in concert. This video was filmed at the Olympic Auditorium in Los Angeles, California.

Bon Jovi was now being managed by Doc McGhee, who realized that Bon Jovi needed a video for MTV. Doc hired video director Wayne Isham, who had directed videos for Doc's other band, Mötley Crüe. The two bands were competitive with each other and Mötley Crüe felt betrayed that Wayne would direct one of Bon Jovi's videos.

Wayne had the band's name painted on the stage and made sure that the band did not see it until they began shooting.

Bon Jovi had been opening for 38 Special, but became a headlining act after the video debuted.

Track listing 
7" single
 "You Give Love a Bad Name" – 3:53
 "Raise Your Hands" – 4:17

12" single
 "You Give Love a Bad Name" – 3:53
 "Raise Your Hands" – 4:17
 "Borderline" – 4:10

7" picture disc single
 "You Give Love a Bad Name" – 3:53
 "Let It Rock" – 5:24

CD Video single
Audio
 "Let It Rock" – 5:24
 "Raise Your Hands" – 4:17
 "Without Live" – 3:32
 "You Give Love a Bad Name" – 3:53

Video
 "You Give Love a Bad Name" – 3:53

Charts and certifications

Weekly charts

Year-end charts

Sales and certifications

Use in media and legacy
The song was used in the game Guitar Hero 5, episodes of Family Guy, 30 Rock, and The Vampire Diaries Season 4 finale, Graduation.

It was placed at No. 20 on VH1's list of the 100 Best Hard Rock Songs.

See also
List of glam metal albums and songs
"Kings & Queens"

References

Bon Jovi songs
1986 singles
1986 songs
Billboard Hot 100 number-one singles
Cashbox number-one singles
Mandaryna songs
Songs written by Desmond Child
Songs written by Richie Sambora
Songs written by Jon Bon Jovi
Music videos directed by Wayne Isham
Song recordings produced by Bruce Fairbairn
Song recordings with Wall of Sound arrangements
Mercury Records singles